Afrin Sports Club is a Syrian professional football club based in Afrin, Syria. The club was founded in 1984. They played in the Syrian Premier League in 2007–08 and 2009–10, and promoted for the 2021–22 season. Club was moved to Aleppo due to the Turkish occupation of Afrin in 2018 and plays home matches at the Hamadaniah and 7 April stadiums.

References

Afrin
Association football clubs established in 1984
1984 establishments in Syria
Afrin District